The wedding dress of Princess Louise Margaret of Prussia was worn by her at her wedding to Prince Arthur, Duke of Connaught and Strathearn, at St. George's Chapel, Windsor, on 13 March 1879. Prince Arthur was the seventh child and third son of Queen Victoria and Prince Albert of Saxe-Coburg and Gotha.

The bride wore a heavy white satin dress, with a band of lace ten centimeters wide encircling the waist. The bridal veil was about   square, made of Alençon lace, the design representing orange blossoms, roses, and myrtle-leaves intertwined.

The veil was fastened to her hair with five diamond stars, the gift of the bridegroom. The handkerchief was made of the same material as the veil and showed the same design, one corner being embellished with the princess's monogram, the other with a Prussian eagle. The Princess carried a bouquet of white flowers.

The bridesmaids wore dresses of white satin duchesse, faille and mousseline de soie, embroidered with wild rosebuds and foliage: the flowers representing England, Scotland, Ireland and Germany.

See also
 List of individual dresses

References

1870s fashion
Louise Margaret
House of Hohenzollern
House of Saxe-Coburg and Gotha (United Kingdom)
British royal attire